Kasey Chambers, Poppa Bill and the Little Hillbillies is the sixth studio album released by Australian country musician, Kasey Chambers, released 6 November 2009 by Liberation Music in Australia. The children's music album is co-credited to Chambers, her father Bill Chambers as "Poppa Bill", and other members of her family as "the Little Hillbillies". It includes a track, "Two Houses", co-written with her oldest son, Talon Hopper.

It was the 19th best selling country album in Australia in 2009. At the Australian Independent Music Awards of 2010, it won best country album. It was nominated for the Best Children's Album at the ARIA Music Awards of 2010 but lost to the Wiggles' Let's Eat.

Track listing
 "The Lost Music Blues" - 2:31
 "The Ballad of Poppa Bill" - 2:40
 "I Spy" - 2:30
 "Poppa Bill Says" - 2:22
 "Do You Remember?" - 2:10
 "Before You Came Along" - 3:15
 "Two Houses" - 2:01
 "Old Man Down on the Farm" - 1:44
 "My Oh My" - 2:57
 "When We Were Kids" - 2:58
 "Sometimes" - 3:16
 "Something in the Water" - 2:41
 "Imagination" - 3:40
 "Blue" - 1:38
 "Christmas Time" - 3:03
 "The Best Years" - 2:18
 "Kasey Chambers Reads 'Little Kasey Chambers and the Lost Music'" - 4:18

Charts

Weekly charts

Year-end charts

References

Kasey Chambers albums
2009 albums